Icahn Enterprises L.P. is an American conglomerate headquartered at Milton Tower in Sunny Isles Beach, Florida. The company has investments in various industries including energy, automotive, food packaging, metals, real estate and home fashion. The company is controlled by Carl Icahn, who owns 88% of it.

History
The company was incorporated on February 17, 1987.

In 2006, the company sold the Sands Atlantic City hotel in Atlantic City, New Jersey and several of the adjacent lots for $274.8 million to Pinnacle Entertainment.

In April 2007, the company sold its American Casino & Entertainment Properties to an affiliate of Goldman Sachs, for $1.3 billion. In September 2007, American Real Estate Partners, another entity controlled by Icahn, merged with the firm and changed its name to Icahn Enterprises L.P.

In 2008, the company acquired PSC Metals for $335 million.

In February 2016, Icahn Enterprises purchased Trump Entertainment Resorts, which owned the Hard Rock Hotel & Casino Atlantic City. The company sold the casino to the owners of Hard Rock Cafe for $50 million in May 2017 - which represented a recuperation of just 4 cents on the dollar. Also in February 2016, the company acquired Pep Boys. 

In January 2017, the company acquired Federal-Mogul.  In June 2017, the company acquired Precision Auto Care, a chain of over 250 vehicle repair shops. In August 2017, the company sold the property formerly known as the Fontainebleau Resort Las Vegas for $600 million. The company had acquired the property in 2010 for $148 million. In October 2017, the company acquired American Driveline Systems. The company had 89,034 employees as of 2017.

In October 2020,  Carl Icahn announced his son Brett would succeed him as chairman of Icahn Enterprises and CEO of its investment subsidiary Icahn Capital LP.

In November 2020, Icahn Enterprises reported third quarter losses of $714 million, compared to a loss of $49 million the same quarter the previous year.

On January 31, 2023, one of its subsidiaries, Auto Plus, filed for Chapter 11 bankruptcy.

Investments
The company owns the following:

 Pep Boys
 CVR - petroleum refining and nitrogen fertilizer manufacturing
 American Railcar Industries
 PSC Metals
 Ferrous Resources (77.2%) - owns mining rights in Brazil
 Viskase (74.6%) - produces cellulosic, fibrous and plastic casings for the processed meat and poultry industry.
 Bayswater Development - a real estate development company operating in Vero Beach, Florida and New Seabury, Massachusetts
 WestPoint Home - bed and bath fashion productions
Vivus - pharma

References

External links

Conglomerate companies of the United States
Holding companies of the United States
Publicly traded companies based in New York City
Companies listed on the Nasdaq
American companies established in 1987
Holding companies established in 1987
1987 establishments in New York (state)
Conglomerate companies established in 1987
Companies based in Miami-Dade County, Florida